Karl Joseph Wirth (6 September 1879 – 3 January 1956) was a German politician of the Catholic Centre Party who served for one year and six months as the chancellor of Germany from 1921 to 1922, as the finance minister from 1920 to 1921, as acting foreign minister of Germany from 1921 to 1922 and again in 1922, as the minister for the Occupied Territories from 1929 to 1930 and as the minister of the Interior from 1930 to 1931. During the postwar era, he participated in the Soviet and East German Communist-controlled neutralist Alliance of Germans party from 1952 until his death in 1956.

Early life
Joseph Wirth was born on 6 September 1879 in Freiburg im Breisgau, in what was then the Grand Duchy of Baden, the son of the Maschinenmeister (working engineer) Karl Wirth and his wife Agathe (née Zeller). According to Wirth himself, the Christian and social involvement of his parents had a strong impact on him.

From 1899 to 1906 he studied mathematics, natural sciences and economics at the University of Freiburg finishing with a dissertation in mathematics.

From 1906 to 1913 Wirth worked as a teacher at a Realgymnasium in Freiburg. In 1909, he was a co-founder and first president of the Akademische Vinzenzkonferenz, a charity run by laymen for the poor.

Early career
In 1911, he was elected to the Freiburg city council for the Catholic Zentrum. From 1913 to 1921, he was a member of the Badischer Landtag, the diet of the Grand Duchy (later the Republic of Baden).

In 1914, Wirth became a member of the Reichstag. His main focus was on social issues. At the start of World War I, Wirth volunteered for military service but was deemed unfit to serve for health reasons. He then joined the Red Cross. From 1914 to 1917,  he worked as a nurse on the Western and Eastern Fronts. After contracting pneumonia, he had to stop.

In July 1917, Wirth voted in the Reichstag for the "peace resolution" sponsored by Matthias Erzberger.

Revolution and Weimar Republic
During the German Revolution of 1918-19, Wirth became Finance Minister of Baden on 10 November 1918, after the provisionary government replaced the Grand Duke's ministers. In January 1919, Wirth was elected to the Constituent Assembly which met at Weimar. At the time he described himself as a "firm republican". In April 1919, he became Finance Minister of the newly created Freistaat Baden.

After the Kapp-Lüttwitz Putsch of March 1920, when the government of Gustav Bauer resigned and was replaced by one led by Hermann Müller, Wirth became Minister of Finance of the Reich. He continued to hold this portfolio in the subsequent cabinet of Konstantin Fehrenbach.

His task was to carry out the system of increased national taxation which his predecessor Matthias Erzberger had induced the Reichstag to adopt. When in May 1921 the Allied ultimatum on reparations ("London ultimatum") was presented to Germany and the sanctions enforced on the Rhine, the Fehrenbach cabinet, which had rejected the London terms, resigned, and Wirth was called upon to form a new cabinet as Reichskanzler. He succeeded in obtaining the cooperation of a number of Democrats (DDP) and Socialists (SPD), including the prominent industrialist and economist Walther Rathenau as Minister of Reconstruction. Wirth himself retained the portfolio of finance. The new government then accepted the Allies' reparation terms — 132 billion marks (£6,600,000,000) payable in yearly installments of £100,000,000 plus the proceeds of a 25% duty on German exports. By 31 August 1921, Germany had paid the first half-yearly installment of £50,000,000, and in the following October Rathenau succeeded in concluding a comprehensive agreement with France for paying reparations in kind for the reconstruction of the devastated regions.

By trying to comply with the Allied demands, the Wirth government attempted to show that it was impossible for the German Reich to satisfy all the reparation demands. The extreme right reacted to Wirth's policy by calling for his assassination.

After the assassination of Erzberger on 26 August 1921, the conflict between the Berlin government and the Bavarian government of Gustav Ritter von Kahr came to a head, the latter showing the same recalcitrancy against carrying out the special ordinances against plots as he had previously exhibited in regard to the dissolution of the illegal volunteer force, the Einwohnerwehr. Wirth stood his ground, and von Kahr was compelled by his own party in Bavaria to resign and make way for a more conciliatory Ministerpräsident.

The strife which arose out of this acute internal crisis had hardly abated when the announcement in mid-October of the decision of the League of Nations on the partition of Upper Silesia between Germany and Poland aroused wild excitement throughout Germany and sent the exchange value of the mark down; on 17 October, it was 750 marks to the pound. For his part, Wirth is recorded as declaring that Poland must be destroyed. Wirth had not concealed his conviction that the severance from Germany of the rich industrial district of Upper Silesia would fatally affect Germany's capacity to pay further reparation installments, and the political tension in Berlin again became acute.

On 22 October 1921, he resigned in protest over the partition of Upper Silesia against the expressed will of the majority of the population. However, on 25 October, Reichspräsident Friedrich Ebert once again asked him to form a government, which Wirth did on 26 October, forming the second Wirth cabinet.

On 16 April 1922, Wirth and Rathenau signed the Treaty of Rapallo which ended Germany's foreign policy isolation. After Rathenau was murdered by right-wing extremists on 24 June 1922, Wirth gave a speech in front of the Reichstag the next day in which he warned that "we are experiencing in Germany a political brutalization" that was characterized by "an atmosphere of murder, of rancor, of poison," and famously proclaimed, "the enemy is on the right!"

On 21 July 1922, the Gesetz zum Schutz der Republik was passed on the initiative of his government, aimed at protecting the republic against its internal enemies. However, by 14 November 1922, Wirth felt that the Erfüllungspolitik of complying with Allied demands had failed and resigned after his attempt to bring all democratic parties together in a coalition failed.

In 1924, Wirth joined the Reichsbanner Schwarz-Rot-Gold, an organization that aimed to protect the republic. When the Zentrum joined the government of Hans Luther in January 1925, Wirth criticized his party for working together with the nationalist DNVP. In August 1925, he left the Zentrum Reichstag fraction in protest over the social policies of his party but retained his seat as an independent.

In April 1929, Wirth became Reichsminister for the occupied territories in the Second Müller Cabinet. After that government's resignation in late March 1930, Wirth became Minister of the Interior in the cabinet of Heinrich Brüning. Wirth was highly popular with the Social Democrats and acted as mediator between them and the new government. In October 1931, he was pushed out of office and replaced by Wilhelm Groener on the personal initiative of Reichspräsident Paul von Hindenburg, who regarded Wirth as a leftist.

Nazi era
In March 1933, two months after Hitler was appointed chancellor by Hindenburg, Wirth spoke passionately in the Reichstag against the Nazi-sponsored Enabling Act, which gave Hitler dictatorial powers. Wirth voted in favor of the Act along with the rest of Centre parliamentary fraction on 24 March. After its passage, Wirth emigrated to Switzerland, settling in Lucerne and purchasing a villa there. He communicated with leading statesmen in Britain and France about the dangers of Nazism, and traveled to the US, where he met with the exiled former chancellor Heinrich Brüning and gave lectures at Harvard University and Princeton University on the Nazi regime. Wirth resided in Paris from 1935 to 1939, when he returned to Lucerne. Subsequently, he made efforts to inform the Vatican about the threat of Nazi Germany's anti-Jewish policies, and during World War II, he secretly kept in touch with anti-Nazi Solf Circle and Kreisau Circle in Germany.

Later life
In 1949, Wirth returned home, after being prevented from doing so by the French occupation authorities for four years. He opposed Konrad Adenauer's policy of Western integration, for fear of making the division of Germany permanent. Together with Wilhelm Elfes, he founded the neutralist "Alliance of Germans" (BdD) in 1953, that was also supported by the SED, and the newspaper Deutsche Volkszeitung. Although Wirth did not approve of Stalin's policies, he believed in a compromise with the USSR in line with the Rapallo Treaty. In 1951, Wirth visited Moscow for political talks.

In the CIA file "The background of Joseph Wirth", it is even claimed that Wirth was a Soviet agent. Unlike West Germany, East Germany paid Wirth a small amount of financial aid. In 1954, Wirth was awarded the East German "Peace Medal" (Friedensmedaille). He received the Stalin Peace Prize in 1955. According to a CIA document Wirth claimed that he met with Lavrentiy Beria and Erwin Respondek (who arranged the meeting) in Karlshorst, Berlin in December 1952. The document states Wirth said Beria asked him to work for the East German government.

He died of heart failure in 1956, aged 76, in his hometown of Freiburg and was buried in the city's main cemetery.

References

Sources

External links
 

1879 births
1956 deaths
20th-century Chancellors of Germany
Politicians from Freiburg im Breisgau
People from the Grand Duchy of Baden
German Roman Catholics
Centre Party (Germany) politicians
Bund der Deutschen politicians
Chancellors of Germany
Finance ministers of Germany
Interior ministers of Germany
Government ministers of Germany
Members of the 13th Reichstag of the German Empire
Members of the Weimar National Assembly
Members of the Reichstag of the Weimar Republic
Members of the Second Chamber of the Diet of the Grand Duchy of Baden
Exiles from Nazi Germany
University of Freiburg alumni
Stalin Peace Prize recipients